Pavlovci is a settlement in the Municipality of Ormož in northeastern Slovenia. The area belongs to the traditional region of Styria and is now included in the Drava Statistical Region.

The railway line from Maribor to Murska Sobota runs through the settlement.

References

External links
Pavlovci on Geopedia

Populated places in the Municipality of Ormož